Shaun Williams (born 13 April 1998) is a South African rugby union player.

Williams hails from a small community of Mooinooi on the platinum belt in the North West province. He attended Garsfontein High School in Pretoria on a bursary as a boarder. He was signed by the Golden Lions and he played for them at U19 and U21 levels, before making his senior debut for the team in the SuperSport Rugby Challenge. Williams was first called into the Blitzbok South African sevens squad in September 2021.

Williams played in the 2022 Commonwealth Games where South Africa won the gold medal.

References 

1998 births
Living people
South African rugby union players
Male rugby sevens players
South Africa international rugby sevens players
Golden Lions players
Commonwealth Games gold medallists for South Africa
Commonwealth Games medallists in rugby sevens
Rugby sevens players at the 2022 Commonwealth Games
Medallists at the 2022 Commonwealth Games